Trenter See is a lake in Lehmkuhlen, Kreis Plön, Schleswig-Holstein, Germany. At an elevation of, its surface area is 0.107 km2.

Lakes of Schleswig-Holstein